Amphidromus alicetandiasae is a species of air-breathing land snail, a terrestrial pulmonate gastropod mollusc in the family Camaenidae.

Habitat 
This species lives on the stem of trees.

Distribution 
Indonesia, Kalimantan Island.

Etymology 
The name is in honour of Alice Tandias, wife of Steven Lie, a landsnail enthusiast from Sumatra.

References 

alicetandiasae
Gastropods described in 2016
Endemic fauna of Indonesia